Soğucak, Kuşadası is a village in the District of Kuşadası, Aydın Province, Turkey. As of 2010 it had a population of 1652 people.

References

Villages in Kuşadası District